The School of Pharmacy is one of the ten degree-granting divisions that comprise Duquesne University in Pittsburgh, Pennsylvania. The school's first pharmacy class matriculated in September 1925 under the leadership of the founding dean, Dr. Hugh C. Muldoon, and graduated in 1928. In May 2000, the School of Pharmacy graduated its first entry-level Doctor of Pharmacy class.

The School of Pharmacy is housed in Duquesne University's Mellon Hall of Science, with new administrative, faculty, and student services offices located in the adjacent Bayer Learning Center.

Curriculum
The full-time on-campus Pharm.D. program is arranged in two phases: a two-year pre-professional stage and four-year professional curricular format.

The School also offers a four-year weekend-only program for candidates with a Bachelor's degree who want to obtain a Pharm.D.

Administration
The Dean of the school is J. Kirk Drennen, Ph.D.

References

External links
 The School of Pharmacy website

School
Pharmacy schools in Pennsylvania
Educational institutions established in 1925
1925 establishments in Pennsylvania